Oliver Kovačević (born 29 October 1974) is a Serbian former professional footballer who played as a goalkeeper.

Since his retirement, Kovačević has worked as a goalkeeping coach for Serbia's OFK Beograd, Rad and Čukarički, but also for Slovenia's Koper.

Club career
After playing for Milicionar, Kovačević made a name for himself at Železnik. He collected over 100 league appearances for the club between 2001 and 2005. Kovačević also captained the team that won 2004–05 Serbia and Montenegro Cup. He subsequently moved abroad and signed with Turkish club Samsunspor. Before ending his active career, Kovačević spent one and a half years at Bulgarian side CSKA Sofia.

International career
In 2005, Kovačević was capped for Serbia and Montenegro under Ilija Petković on three occasions. He was also a member of the team at the 2006 FIFA World Cup, but failed to make any appearances.

Honours
Železnik
 Serbia and Montenegro Cup: 2004–05
CSKA Sofia
 Bulgarian Cup: 2005–06

References

External links
 
 
 
 

2006 FIFA World Cup players
Association football goalkeepers
First Professional Football League (Bulgaria) players
Expatriate footballers in Bulgaria
Expatriate footballers in Turkey
First League of Serbia and Montenegro players
FK Milicionar players
FK Železnik players
PFC CSKA Sofia players
Samsunspor footballers
Serbia and Montenegro expatriate footballers
Serbia and Montenegro expatriate sportspeople in Bulgaria
Serbia and Montenegro expatriate sportspeople in Turkey
Serbia and Montenegro footballers
Serbia and Montenegro international footballers
Serbian expatriate footballers
Serbian expatriate sportspeople in Bulgaria
Serbian expatriate sportspeople in Slovenia
Serbian footballers
Serbs of Croatia
Footballers from Split, Croatia
1974 births
Living people